Cassville is a hamlet in Oneida County, New York, United States. Cassville is situated on and adjacent to New York State Route 8 in the town of Paris.

Notable people
 Brad Roberts, an ice hockey player for the Youngstown SteelHounds, is a Cassville native.
 William R. Williams (1884–1972), a Republican member of the United States House of Representatives from New York, lived and died in Cassville.

See also
 List of places named for Lewis Cass

References

Hamlets in New York (state)
Hamlets in Oneida County, New York